Weberbauerella brongniartioides is a South American species of legume. It is the only member of the genus Weberbauerella (though some sources also list Weberbauerella raimondiana Ferreyra). It was recently assigned to the informal monophyletic Dalbergia clade of the Dalbergieae.

References

Dalbergieae
Monotypic Fabaceae genera